The Idaho Department of Environmental Quality is the department of the Idaho state government responsible for administration of state and federal environmental laws and regulations. The main offices of the department are in Boise, six regional offices are also maintained.

History 
The department was established upon the passing of the Idaho Environmental Protection and Health Act.

Structure and functions 
It is organized into five divisions:
Air Quality: responsible for monitoring air pollution and permits relating to same
Water Quality: sets water quality standards and monitors ground, surface, and drinking water quality
Waste Management and Remediation: responsible for all issues relating to waste disposal
Environmental Management and Information: provides technical communications services including publications
Technical Services: the research and technical enforcement division, including inspection activities

The department also exercises non-regulatory oversight over the Idaho National Laboratory.

The director of the department reports to the governor. Additional regulatory authority is vested in the Idaho Board of Environmental Quality, which, with the advice of the state attorney general, sets rules and regulations carried out by the department.

External links
Department official website

References 

Environmental Quality
State environmental protection agencies of the United States